MDMA is a psychoactive drug.

MDMA may also refer to:

MDMA (film), an American crime drama film
"MDMA", 2021 song produced by American musician AronChupa
"MDMA", 2022 German rap song on the Ken Carson album X

See also